April 19 - Eastern Orthodox liturgical calendar - April 21

All fixed commemorations below are observed on May 3 by Eastern Orthodox Churches on the Old Calendar.

For April 20th, Orthodox Churches on the Old Calendar commemorate the Saints listed on April 7.

Saints

 Apostle Zacchaeus of the Seventy, Bishop of Caesarea in Palestine, he who was called down from the Sycamore tree by Jesus, according to the Gospel of Luke (1st century)
 Martyrs Acindinus, Antoninus, Victor, Zenon, Zoticus, Theonas, Caesareus, Severian and Christophoros (284-305) (see also: April 18 - Slavic)
 Venerable Theodore Trichinas ("the Hair-Shirt Wearer"), hermit near Constantinople (400)
 Saint Theotimus, Bishop of Tomis in Moesia (Lesser Scythia) (407)
 Blessed Gregory (593) and Anastasius I (599), Patriarchs of Antioch.
 Hieromartyr Anastasius II, Patriarch of Antioch (609)
 Venerable Anastasius Sinaita, Abbot of the Monastery of St. Catherine at Sinai (c. 700) (see also: April 21)
 Venerable Ioannis the Palaiolavritis ("of the Old Lavra"), at St. Chariton's Monastery, in the Judean Desert. (see also: April 19)

Pre-Schism Western saints

 Martyrs Sulpicius and Servilian, martyrs in Rome who were beheaded under Trajan (c. 117)
 Saints Marcellinus of Embrun, Vincent and Domninus, born in North Africa, they went to France and preached in the Dauphiné (c. 374)
 Saint Marcian of Auxerre, a monk at the Monastery of Saints Cosmas and Damian in Auxerre (c. 470)
 Saint Cædwalla of Wessex (Cadwalla), King of the West Saxons (689)
 Saint Gundebert (Gumbert), monk-martyr (8th century)
 Saint Harduin, a monk at Fontenelle Abbey in France (749), then a hermit who copied writings of the Fathers (811)
 Saint Hugh of Anzy-le-Duc, a monk at Saint Savin (c. 930)

Post-Schism Orthodox saints

 Venerable Saints Athanasius (1380) and Ioasaph (1422) of Meteora, Abbots.
 Venerable Alexander of Oshevensk, founder of Oshevensk Monastery, Arkhangelsk (1479)
 Child-Martyr Gabriel of Zabludov (Gabriel of Slutsk) (1690)

New martyrs and confessors

 New Hiero-Confessor Theodosius (Ganitsky), Bishop of Kolomna (1937)

Other commemorations

 "Cyprus" (392) and "Keepiazh" (Kipyazha) Icons of the Mother of God.
 Translation of the relics (1991) of St. Nikolai (Velimirovich), Bishop of Ochrid and Zhicha (1956) from America to Serbia.
 Repose of Schemamonk Ignatius of St. Nicephorus Monastery in Olonets (1852)

Icon gallery

Notes

References

Sources
 April 20 / May 3. Orthodox Calendar (pravoslavie.ru).
 May 3 / April 20. Holy Trinity Russian Orthodox Church (A parish of the Patriarchate of Moscow).
 April 20. OCA - The Lives of the Saints.
 The Autonomous Orthodox Metropolia of Western Europe and the Americas. St. Hilarion Calendar of Saints for the year of our Lord 2004. St. Hilarion Press (Austin, TX). p. 30.
 April 20. Latin Saints of the Orthodox Patriarchate of Rome.
 The Roman Martyrology. Transl. by the Archbishop of Baltimore. Last Edition, According to the Copy Printed at Rome in 1914. Revised Edition, with the Imprimatur of His Eminence Cardinal Gibbons. Baltimore: John Murphy Company, 1916. pp. 110–111.
 Rev. Richard Stanton. A Menology of England and Wales, or, Brief Memorials of the Ancient British and English Saints Arranged According to the Calendar, Together with the Martyrs of the 16th and 17th Centuries. London: Burns & Oates, 1892. pp. 168–173.
Greek Sources
 Great Synaxaristes:  20 Απριλίου. Μεγασ Συναξαριστησ.
  Συναξαριστής. 20 Απριλίου. ecclesia.gr. (H Εκκλησια Τησ Ελλαδοσ). 
Russian Sources
  3 мая (20 апреля). Православная Энциклопедия под редакцией Патриарха Московского и всея Руси Кирилла (электронная версия). (Orthodox Encyclopedia - Pravenc.ru).
  20 апреля (ст.ст.) 3 мая 2013 (нов. ст.). Русская Православная Церковь Отдел внешних церковных связей.

April in the Eastern Orthodox calendar